Francine du Plessix Gray (September 25, 1930 – January 13, 2019), was a French-American Pulitzer Prize–nominated writer and literary critic.

Early life and education 
She was born on September 25, 1930, in Warsaw, Poland, where her father, Vicomte Bertrand Jochaud du Plessix, was a French diplomat – the commercial attaché. She spent her early years in Paris, where a milieu of mixed cultures and a multilingual family (French father and Russian mother) influenced her. Her father, then a sub-lieutenant in the Free French Air Force died in 1940, shot down near Gibraltar.

Her mother, Tatiana Iacovleff du Plessix (1906–1991), had come to France as a refugee from Bolshevik Russia, and ended an engagement to Vladimir Mayakovsky in 1928, before marrying du Plessix. During her widowhood, she once again became a refugee, escaping occupied France via Lisbon to New York in 1940 or 1941 with Francine and Alexander Liberman (1912–1999). In 1942, she married Liberman, another White Russian émigré, whom she had known in Paris as a child. (During his love affair with Liberman's mother, her uncle, Alexandre Yacovleff, had recruited Tatiana to keep the boy occupied.) He was a noted artist and later a longtime editorial director of Vogue magazine and then of Condé Nast Publications. The Libermans were socially prominent in media, art and fashion circles.

For the first six months in the United States, young Francine lived with her mother's father (whom she had never met) in Rochester, New York, while her mother settled in. She grew up in New York City and was naturalized a U.S. citizen in 1952. She was a scholarship student at Spence School, where she fainted in the library from malnutrition. Her mother learned that she had not been eating the meals the housekeeper prepared for her. She attended Bryn Mawr College for two years, and earned a B.A. in philosophy at Barnard College in 1952.

Career
From 1952 to 1954, Gray worked as a night-desk reporter for United Press International in New York City. From 1954 to 1955, she was an editorial assistant for Réalités, a French magazine,  Paris. She became a freelance writer in 1955. From 1964 to 1966, she was a book editor for Art in America in New York City. In 1968, she became a staff writer for The New Yorker with Robert Gottlieb as her editor. In 1975, she was a distinguished visiting professor at City College of New York. In 1981, she was a visiting lecturer at Saybrook College, Yale University. Since 1983, she was an adjunct professor for the School of Fine Arts at Columbia University. Since 1986, she was a ferris professor at Princeton University. She became an Annenberg fellow at Brown University in 1997.

She was a member of the American Academy of Arts and Letters, Authors Guild, Institute of Humanities at New York University, and International PEN.

Personal life 
On 23 April 1957, she married the painter Cleve Gray and until his death they lived together in Connecticut. They had two sons, Luke and Thaddeus Ives Gray. Francine du Plessix Gray died on January 13, 2019, in Manhattan.

Awards
Putnam Creative Writing Award from Barnard College, 1952
National Catholic Book Award from Catholic Press Association, 1971, for Divine Disobedience: Profiles in Catholic Radicalism
Front Page Award from Newswomen's Club of New York, 1972, for Hawaii: The Sugar-Coated Fortress
LL.D.
City University of New York, 1981
Oberlin College, 1985
University of Santa Clara, 1985
St. Mary's College of California
University of Hartford
Guggenheim fellow 1991–92
National Book Critics Circle Award for autobiography, 2006, for Them: A Memoir of Parents.

Books
Divine disobedience: profiles in Catholic radicalism. New York: Knopf, 1970.
Hawaii: the sugar-coated fortress. New York: Random House, 1972.
Lovers and tyrants. New York: Simon & Schuster, 1976.
World without end: a novel. New York: Simon & Schuster, 1981.
October blood. New York: Simon & Schuster, 1985.
ADAM & EVE and the CITY. Simon & Schuster, 1987.
Soviet women: walking the tightrope. New York: Doubleday, 1990.
Rage and fire: a life of Louise Colet, pioneer feminist, literary star, Flaubert's muse. New York: Simon & Schuster, 1994.
At home with the Marquis de Sade: a life. New York, NY: Simon & Schuster, 1998.
Simone Weil. New York: Viking Press, 2001.

Madame de Staël. Atlas & Co. 2008. .

References

External links
New York Times article, At Home with Francine du Plessix Gray: A Back Turned On the High Life
Francine du Plessix Gray's books online
Boston Globe interview with Gray
New York Review of Books Gray Bibliography

1930 births
2019 deaths
Writers from Warsaw
Barnard College alumni
French emigrants to the United States
French people of Russian descent
American women writers
Spence School alumni
Bryn Mawr College alumni
The New Yorker staff writers
21st-century American women
Members of the American Academy of Arts and Letters